Tink may refer to:

People
Andrew Tink (born 1953), Australian politician in the New South Wales Legislative Assembly 1988–2007
Rowan Tink AM (born 1955), Australian Special Air Service officer
Tink Riviere (1899–1965), American Major League Baseball pitcher
Tink Turner (1890–1962), American Major League Baseball pitcher
Tink (musician), (born 1995), American rapper and singer-songwriter

Places
Tink, Iran

Arts and entertainment
Tink of S.E., a 1987 album by Washington, D.C. indie band Unrest

Natural world
Common tink frog, a species of frog in the family Leptodactylidae; the male makes a loud metallic "tink" sound during the night
Tink-tink cisticola, a species of bird in the family Cisticolidae, found in Angola, Eswatini, Lesotho, Mozambique, South Africa, and Zambia

See also
Tinker (disambiguation)
Tinkle (surname)
Tinks Pottinger (born 1956), New Zealand Olympic horsewoman

de:Tink
es:Tink